is a 2022 British dark comedy film written and directed by Neil Maskell. The film stars Amit Shah, Sura Dohnke, Tom Burke, Roger Evans and Jenna Coleman. The title  is Dutch for "bell ringer". 

It had its world premiere at the 2022 Toronto International Film Festival on 9 September 2022 as part of series of private screenings for film distributors. It had its first public screening for the 2022 edition of the BFI London Film Festival in October 2022.

Cast
 Amit Shah as Ewan
 Sura Dohnke as Silke
 Tom Burke as Chris
 Roger Evans as Glynn
 Jenna Coleman as Flo

Production
In February 2021, it was announced that Jenna Coleman and Tom Burke would lead the cast of Klokkenluider, the film directorial debut of actor Neil Maskell.

Principal photography began on 28 February 2021 and ended on 18 April in Sussex, England.

References

External links
 

2022 films
British comedy films
2020s British films